Krynychna is an urban-type settlement in Makiivka Municipality (district) in Donetsk Oblast of eastern Ukraine. Population:

Demographics
Native language as of the Ukrainian Census of 2001:
 Ukrainian 12.61%
 Russian 87.09%
 Belarusian 0.15%
 Jewish 0.02%

References

Urban-type settlements in Donetsk Raion